Henri Dartigues (17 September 1902 – 7 September 1967) was a French middle-distance runner. He competed in the men's 3000 metres steeplechase at the 1928 Summer Olympics.

References

External links
 

1902 births
1967 deaths
Athletes (track and field) at the 1928 Summer Olympics
French male middle-distance runners
French male steeplechase runners
Olympic athletes of France
Place of birth missing
20th-century French people